Konrad Walentin Huber (4 November 1892 – 4 December 1960) was a Finnish sport shooter who competed in the 1924 Summer Olympics and the 1952 Summer Olympics. In 1924 he won the bronze medal as member of the Finnish team in the team clay pigeons competition and the silver medal in the individual trap event.

References

External links
Profile

1892 births
1960 deaths
Sportspeople from Helsinki
People from Uusimaa Province (Grand Duchy of Finland)
Swedish-speaking Finns
Finnish male sport shooters
Olympic shooters of Finland
Shooters at the 1924 Summer Olympics
Shooters at the 1952 Summer Olympics
Olympic silver medalists for Finland
Olympic bronze medalists for Finland
Trap and double trap shooters
Olympic medalists in shooting
Medalists at the 1924 Summer Olympics